The Șercăița is a left tributary of the river Șercaia in Romania. It flows into the Șercaia between Șinca and Vad.

References

Rivers of Romania
Rivers of Brașov County